Brunk may refer to:

 Brunk, Radeče a place in Slovenia
 2499 Brunk a minor planet discovered in 1978
 Terry Brunk (born 1964), American professional wrestler better known as Sabu
 William E. Brunk, American astronomer